Watch Your Own Heart Attack is a two-minute public information film advertisement produced by the British Heart Foundation, starring Steven Berkoff, which illustrates how it feels to have a heart attack.  It was first shown on ITV1 on 10 August 2008.

The “Hollywood” heart attack 

The stereotypical heart attack, represented in films (such as Ocean's Thirteen, where Elliott Gould was shown falling over and clutching his chest, and Something's Gotta Give which showed Jack Nicholson's character being rescued from his attack by Diane Keaton) and in television is not always true to life, yet a YouGov poll discovered that 38 per cent of people believe the signs of a heart attack will always be crippling chest pains.

The British Heart Foundation was concerned that many people underestimated the effect of a heart attack due to the way they are represented on television programmes and in films, so produced the film in an attempt to educate viewers about the devastating realities of an attack.

The film features actor Steven Berkoff who punches and gags a largely unseen person and aims to graphically illustrate what it is like to have a heart attack, simulating the symptoms by using methods including a punch to the chest, taping the mouth of the sufferer to simulate breathing difficulties, and hugging them to show tightness in the chest, and ends with the victim vomiting while Berkoff warns that not all heart attack symptoms are as obvious as people think. They could be mistaken for a sports injury, indigestion, "last night's curry" or similar.

Production 
This public information film advertisement, the first work for the charity by advertising agency Grey London since it won the account of British Heart Foundation in May 2008, was conceived by creative director Jon Williams, art director Damon Troth and copywriter Joanna Perry at Grey and directed by Brett Foraker through RSA Films. It is filmed from the subjective perspective of the heart attack victim.  Jon Williams, chief creative officer at Grey London, has commented that when researching ideas for the spot, someone observed, "what you really need to do is give everyone in Britain a heart attack," which is what the film aims to achieve through its use of subjective point of view.

A British Heart Foundation spokesman said the film aims to alert people to call 999 as soon as they experience heart attack symptoms and not to dismiss them as being caused by a minor problems.

Advertising campaign 
A billboard advertising campaign was launched across the UK in the weeks running up to the showing, while personalities such as Angela Rippon, David Cameron, Ainsley Harriott and Jeremy Kyle gave their backing to the film.

The viewing figures for the film were 6.5 million, which is higher than the 6.1 million that the episode of Midsomer Murders, during which the film ran, received.

References

External links 
British Heart Foundation – Official site (with Video clip and caption: "Watch this film and together we could save the life you love: The most important two minutes you'll ever see.")

British short films
Public information films
2008 films
2008 short films
2000s educational films
British educational films